Daniel Morris Cohen (6 July 1930 - 26 September 2016) was an American ichthyologist who was known for his studies on the taxonomy of salmonid, gadid, and ophidiform fishes.

Cohen mainly studied the taxonomy of deep-sea fishes in the orders Salmoniformes, Gadiformes, and Ophidiformes. He held the post of professor of biology at the University of Florida for one year. He then took an appointment at the  U.S. Bureau of Commercial Fisheries Ichthyological Laboratory in Washington, D.C. as a systematic zoologist. He stayed there for 23 years before moving to California to become the Chief Curator of Life Sciences at the Natural History Museum of Los Angeles County. Cohen was the Deputy Director for Research and Collections when he retired in 1995.

References

American ichthyologists
1930 births
2016 deaths